The mung bean (Vigna radiata), alternatively known as the green gram, maash (٫  )٫ mūng, monggo, or munggo (Philippines), is a plant species in the legume family. The mung bean is mainly cultivated in East, Southeast and South Asia. It is used as an ingredient in both savoury and sweet dishes.

Description
The green gram is an annual vine with yellow flowers and fuzzy brown pods.

The English word mung originated from the Hindi word , which is derived from the Sanskrit word .

Morphology 
Mung bean (Vigna radiata) is a plant species of Fabaceae which is also known as green gram. It is sometimes confused with black gram (Vigna mungo) for their similar morphology, though they are two different species. The green gram is an annual vine with yellow flowers and fuzzy brown pods. There are three subgroups of Vigna radiata, including one cultivated (Vigna radiata subsp. radiata) and two wild ones (Vigna radiata subsp. Sublobata and Vigna radiata subsp. glabra). It has a height of about 15–125 cm.

Mung bean has a well-developed root system. The lateral roots are many and slender, with root nodules grown. Stems are much branched, sometimes twining at the tips. Young stems are purple or green, and mature stems are grayish yellow or brown. They can be divided into erect cespitose, semi-trailing and trailing types. Wild types tend to be prostrate while cultivated types are more erect.

Leaves are ovoid or broad-ovoid, cotyledons die after emergence, and ternate leaves are produced on two single leaves. The leaves are 6–12 cm long and 5–10 cm wide. Racemes with yellow flowers are borne in the axils and tips of the leaves, with 10-25 flowers per pedicel, self-pollinated. The fruits are elongated cylindrical or flat cylindrical pods, usually 30-50 per plant. The pods are 5–10 cm long and 0.4-0.6 cm wide and contain 12-14 septum-separated seeds, which are either green, yellow, brown or blue and can be cylindrical or spherical in shape. Seed colors and presence or absence of a rough layer are used to distinguish different types of mung bean.

Growth stages 

Germination is typically within 4–5 days, but the actual rate varies according to the amount of moisture introduced during the germination stage. It is epigeal, with the stem and cotyledons emerging from the seedbed.

After germination, the seed splits, and a soft, whitish root grows. Mung bean sprouts are harvested during this stage. If not harvested, it develops a root system, then a green stem which contains two leaves shoots up from the soil. After that, seed pods begin to form on its branches, with 10-15 seeds contained in each pod.

The maturation can take up to 60 days. Once matured, it can reach up to 30 inches (76 cm) tall, with multiple branches with seed pods. Most of the seed pods become darker, while some remain green.

Nitrogen fixation and cover crop 
As a legume plant, mung bean is in symbiotic association with Rhizobia which enables it to fix atmospheric nitrogen (58–109 kg per ha mung bean). It can provide large amounts of biomass (7.16 t biomass/ha) and nitrogen to the soil (ranging from 30 to 251 kg/ha). The nitrogen fixation ability not only enables it to meet its own nitrogen requirement, but also benefit the succeeding crops. It can be used as a cover crop before or after cereal crops in rotation, which makes a good green manure.

Taxonomy
Mung beans are one of many species moved from the genus Phaseolus to Vigna in the 1970s. The previous names were Phaseolus aureus or P. radiatus.

Cultivation

Varieties 
The mung bean varieties now are mainly targeted in resistance to pests and diseases, particularly the bean weevil and mung bean yellow mosaic virus (MYMV). For now, the main varieties include Samrat, IPM2-3, SML 668 and Meha in India; Crystal, Jade-AU, Celera-AU，Satin II，Regur in Australia; Zhonglv No.1, Zhonglv No.2, Jilv No.2, Jilv No.7, Weilv No.4, Jihong 9218, Jihong 8937, Bao 876-16, Bao 8824-17 in China. Also, with the help of the World Vegetable Center, the traits of mung bean have been considerably improved.

'Summer Moong' is a short duration mung bean pulse crop grown in northern India. Due to its short duration, it can fit well inbetween of many cropping systems. It is mainly cultivated in East and Southeast Asia and the Indian subcontinent. It is considered to be the hardiest of all pulse crops and requires a hot climate for germination and growth.

Climate and soil requirements 
Mung bean is a warm season and frost-intolerant plant. Mung bean is suitable for being planted in temperate, sub-tropical and tropical regions. The most suitable temperature for mung bean's germination and growth is 15-18 °C. Mung bean has high adaptability to various soil types, while the best pH of the soil is between 6.2 and 7.2. Mung bean is a short-day plant and long days will delay its flowering and podding.

Harvest 
The yield potential of mung bean is around 2.5 to 3.0 t/ha, however, usually due to the resistance to environmental stress and improper management, the average productivity for mung bean is only 0.5 t/ha. Since the indeterminate flowering habit of mung bean, when facing the proper environmental conditions, there can be both flowers and pods in one mung bean plant, which make it difficult for harvesting mung bean. The perfect harvesting stage is when 90% of pods' colour in one yield has been black. Mung bean can use a harverster for harvesting. It is important to set up the header in case of over-threshing.

Transportation and storage condition 
The perfect moisture of grain for transportation is 13%. Before storage, the cleaning and grading process must be done. The ideal storage condition should keep the mung bean's moisture at exactly 12%.

Pests, diseases and abiotic stress 
Most of the mung bean cultivars have a yield potential of 1.8-2.5 tons/ha. However, the actual average productivity of mung bean hovers around 0.5-0.7 t/ha. Several factors constrain its yield, including biotic stresses (pests and diseases) and abiotic stresses. Stresses not only decrease productivity but also affect the physical quality of seeds, leading to be totally unusable or unfit for human consumption. All the stresses collectively can lead to significant yield losses of up to 10%-100%.

Pests 
Insect pests attack mung bean at all crop stages from sowing to storage stage and take a heavy toll on crop yield. Some insect pests directly damage the crop, while others act as vectors of diseases to transmit the virus.

Stem fly (bean fly) is one of the major pests of mung bean. This pest infests the crop within a week after germination and under epidemic conditions, it can cause total crop loss.

Whitefly, B. tabaci, is a serious pest in mung bean and damages the crop either directly by feeding on phloem sap and excreting honeydew on the plant that forms black sooty mould or indirectly by transmitting mung bean yellow mosaic disease (MYMD). Whitefly causes yield losses between 17% and 71% in mung bean.

Thrips infest mung bean both in the seedling and in flowering stages. During the seedling stage, thrips infest the seedling's growing point when it emerges from the ground, and under severe infestation, the seedlings fail to grow. Flowering thrips cause heavy damage and attack during flowering and pod formation, which feed on the pedicles and stigma of flowers. Under severe infestation, flowers drop and no pod formation takes place.

Spotted pod borer, Maruca vitrata, is a major insect pest in mung bean in the tropics and subtropics. The pest causes a yield loss of 2–84% in mung bean amounting to US $30 million. The larvae damage all the stages of the crop including flowers, stems, peduncles, and pods; however, heavy damage occurs at the flowering stage where the larvae form webs combining flowers and leaves.

Cowpea aphid sucks plant sap that causes loss of plant vigor and may lead to yellowing, stunting or distortion of plant parts. Further, aphids secrete honeydew (unused sap) which leads to the development of sooty mould on plant parts. Cowpea aphid also can act as a vector of the mung bean common mosaic virus.

Bruchid is the most severe stored pests of legume seeds worldwide, damage up to 100% losses within 3–6 months, if not controlled. Bruchid infestation in mungbean results in weight loss, low germination, and nutritional changes in seeds, thereby reducing the nutritional and market value, rendering it unfit for human consumption, agricultural and commercial uses.

Diseases 

Mungbean yellow mosaic disease (MYMD) is a significant viral disease of mung bean, which causes severe yield losses annually. MYMD is caused by three distinct begomoviruses, transmitted by whitefly. The economic losses due to MYMD account for up to 85% yield reduction in India.

The major fungal diseases are Cercospora leaf spot (CLS), dry root rot, powdery mildew and anthracnose. Dry root rot (Macrophomina phaseolina) is an emerging disease of mungbean, causing 10–44% yield losses in mung bean production in India and Pakistan. The pathogen affects the fibrovascular system of the roots and basal internodes of its host, impeding the transport of water and nutrients to the upper parts of the plant.

Halo blight, bacterial leaf spot, and tan spot are significant bacterial diseases.

Abiotic stress 
Abiotic stresses negatively influence plant growth and productivity and are the primary causes of extensive agricultural losses worldwide. Reduction in crop yield due to environmental variations has increased steadily over the decades.

Salinity affects crop growth and yield by the way of osmotic stress, ion toxicity, and reduced nodulation which ultimately lead to reduced nitrogen-fixing ability. Excessive salt leads to leaf injury and then reduced photosynthesis.

High-temperature stress negatively affects reproductive development in mung bean and affects all reproductive traits like flower initiation, pollen viability, fertilization, pod set, seed quality, etc. High Temperature over 42 °C during summer causes hardening of seeds due to incomplete sink development.

Mung bean requires a light moisture regime in the soil during its growing period, while at the time of harvest complete dry conditions are required. Since it is mostly grown under rainfed conditions, it is more susceptible to water deficiencies as compared to many other food legumes. Drought affects its growth and development by negatively affecting vegetative growth, flower initiation, abnormal pollen behavior and pod set. However, simultaneously, excess moisture or waterlogging, even for a short period of time, especially at the early vegetative stage may be detrimental to the crop.

Mung bean may also be affected by excess soil and atmospheric moisture during the rainy season which may lead to pre-harvest sprouting in mature pods. It deteriorates the quality of the seed/grain produced.

Integrated disease management 
Using climate analysis tools delivered on the web can firstly help farmers to interrogate climate records to ask questions relating to rainfall, temperature, radiation, and derived variables to avoid some of the abiotic stresses. Deployment of varieties with genetic resistance is the most effective and durable method for integrated disease management, in the mean time focusing on yield, height, grain quality, market opportunities and seed availability. For pre-harvest sprouting (PHS), the development of mung bean cultivars with short (10–15 days) period of fresh seed dormancy (FSD) is important to curtail losses incurred by PHS.

Market 
Mung bean plants have a long history of being consumed by humans. The main consumed parts are the seeds and sprouts. The mature seeds provide an invaluable source of digestible protein for humans in places where meat is lacking or where people are mostly vegetarian. Mung bean has a large market in Asia (India, Southeast-Asia and East Asia) and is also consumed in Southern Europe and in the Southern USA. Mung bean protein is considered safe as a novel food (NF) pursuant to Regulation (EU) 2015/2283. The consumption of mung bean varies depending on the geographic region. For instance, in India, mung bean is used in sweets, snacks and savoury items. In other parts of Asia, it is used in cakes, sprouts, noodles and soups. In Europe and America, it is mainly used as fresh bean sprouts. The consumption of mung beans as such in the US is in the order of 22–29 g/capita per year, while the consumption in some areas of Asia can be as high as 2 kg/capita per year.

Mung bean is considered an alternative crop in many regions, which is generally preferable to sign a contract for the growing process before planting. In the US, the average price of mung bean is around $0.20 per pound. This is double the price of soybeans. The difference in production costs for mung bean and soybean is the post-harvest cleaning and/or transportation. Overall, mung bean is considered to have market potential for their drought tolerance, and they are a food crop and not a feed crop, which can help buffer the economic risk from variability in commodity crop prices for the farmers.

Uses

Nutritional value 
Mung beans are recognized for their high nutritive value. Mung beans contain about 55%–65% carbohydrate (equal to 630 g/kg dry weight) and are rich in protein, fat, vitamins and minerals. It is composed of about 20%-50% protein of total dry weight, among which globulin (60%) and albumin (25%) are the primary storage proteins (see table). Mung bean is considered to be a substantive source of dietary proteins. The proteolytic cleavage of these proteins are even higher during sprouting. Mung bean carbohydrates are easily digestible, which causes less flatulence in humans compared to other forms of legumes. Both seeds and sprouts of mung bean produce lower calories compared to other cereals, which makes it more attractive to obese and diabetic individuals.

Whole beans and paste
Whole cooked mung beans are generally prepared from dried beans by boiling until they are soft. Mung beans are light yellow in colour when their skins are removed. Mung bean paste can be made by hulling, cooking, and pulverizing the beans to a dry paste.

South Asia 
Although whole mung beans are also occasionally used in Indian cuisine, beans without skins are more commonly used. In Karnataka, Maharashtra, Gujarat, Kerala and Tamil Nadu, whole mung beans are commonly boiled to make a dry preparation often served with congee. Hulled mung beans can also be used in a similar fashion as whole beans for the purpose of making sweet soups.

Mung beans in some regional cuisines of India are stripped of their outer coats to make mung dal.

In the South Indian states of Karnataka, Tamil Nadu, Telangana and Andhra Pradesh, and also in Maharashtra, steamed whole beans are seasoned with spices and fresh grated coconut. In South India, especially Andhra Pradesh, batter made from ground whole moong beans (including skin) is used to make a variety of dosa called pesarattu or pesara dosa.

East Asia 
They are also often cooked with rice to make congee. Unlike in South Asia, whole mung beans seldom appear in savory dishes.

In Hong Kong, hulled mung beans and mung bean paste are made into ice cream or frozen ice pops. Mung bean paste is used as a common filling for Chinese mooncakes in East China and Taiwan. During the Dragon Boat Festival, the boiled and shelled beans are used as filling in zongzi prepared for consumption. The beans may also be cooked until soft, blended into a liquid, sweetened, and served as a beverage, popular in many parts of China. In South China and Vietnam, mung bean paste may be mixed with sugar, fat, and fruits or spices to make pastries, such as bánh đậu xanh.

In Korea, skinned mung beans are soaked and ground with some water to make a thick batter. This is used as a basis for the Korean pancakes called bindae-tteok. They are also commonly used for Hobak-tteok.

Southeast Asia 
In the Philippines, ginisáng monggó/mónggo (sautéed mung bean stew), also known as monggó/mónggo guisado or balatong, is a savoury stew of whole mung beans with prawns or fish. It is traditionally served on Fridays of Lent, when the majority of Catholic Filipinos traditionally abstain from meat. Variants of ginisáng monggó/mónggo may also be made with chicken or pork. Mung beans are also used in the Filipino dessert ginataang munggo (also known as balatong), a rice gruel with coconut milk and sugar flavored with pandan leaves or vanilla.

Mung bean paste is also a common filling of pastries known as bakpia in Indonesia and hopia the Philippines, and further afield in Guyana (where it is known as "black eye cake"). It is also used as a filling for pan de monggo, a Filipino bread. In Indonesia, mung beans are also made into a popular dessert snack called es kacang hijau, which has the consistency of a porridge. The beans are cooked with sugar, coconut milk, and a little ginger.

Middle East 
A staple diet in some parts of the Middle East is mung beans and rice. Both are cooked together in a pilaf-like rice dish called , which means mung beans and rice.

Bean sprouts

Mung beans are germinated by leaving them in water for four hours of daytime light and spending the rest of the day in the dark. Mung bean sprouts can be grown under artificial light for four hours over the period of a week. They are usually simply called "bean sprouts". However, when bean sprouts are called for in recipes, it generally refers to mung bean or soybean sprouts.

Mung bean sprouts are stir-fried as a Chinese vegetable accompaniment to a meal, usually with garlic, ginger, spring onions, or pieces of salted dried fish to add flavour. Uncooked bean sprouts are used in filling for Vietnamese spring rolls, as well as a garnish for phở. They are a major ingredient in a variety of Malaysian and Peranakan cuisine, including char kway teow, hokkien mee, mee rebus, and pasembor.

In Korea, slightly cooked mung bean sprouts, called sukjunamul, are often served as a side dish. They are blanched (placed into boiling water for less than a minute), immediately cooled in cold water, and mixed with sesame oil, garlic, salt, and often other ingredients.

In the Philippines, mung bean sprouts are called togue and are most commonly used in lumpia rolls called lumpiang togue.

In India, mung bean sprouts are cooked with green chili, garlic, and other spices.

In Indonesia the food are often used as fillings like tahu isi (stuffed tofu) and complementary ingredient in many dishes such as rawon and soto.

In Japan, the sprouts are called moyashi.

Starch

Mung bean starch, which is extracted from ground mung beans, is used to make transparent cellophane noodles (also known as bean thread noodles, bean threads, glass noodles, fensi, tung hoon, or ). Cellophane noodles become soft and slippery when they are soaked in hot water. A variation of cellophane noodles, called mung bean sheets or green bean sheets, are also available.

In Korea, a jelly called nokdumuk (also called cheongpomuk) is made from mung bean starch; a similar jelly, colored yellow with the addition of gardenia coloring, is called hwangpomuk.

In northern China, mung bean jelly is called liangfen, which is a very popular food during summer. The Hokkiens add sugar to mung bean jelly to make it a dessert called Lio̍k-tāu hún-kóe.

Plant-based protein
Mung beans are increasingly used in plant-based meat and egg alternatives such as Beyond Meat and Eat Just's Just Egg.

History of domestication and cultivation

The mung bean was domesticated in India, where its progenitor (Vigna radiata subspecies sublobata) occurs wild.

Carbonized mung beans have been discovered in many archeological sites in India. Areas with early finds include the eastern zone of the Harappan civilisation in modern-day Pakistan and western- and northwestern India, where finds date back about 4,500 years, and South India in the modern state of Karnataka where finds date back more than 4,000 years. Some scholars, therefore, infer two separate domestications in the northwest and south of India. In South India, there is evidence for the evolution of larger-seeded mung beans 3,500 to 3,000 years ago. By about 3500 years ago mung beans were widely cultivated throughout India.

Cultivated mung beans later spread from India to China and Southeast Asia. Archaeobotanical research at the site of Khao Sam Kaeo in southern Thailand indicates that mung beans had arrived in Thailand by at least 2,200 years ago.

See also

 Black bean paste
 Douzhi
 Mung bean nuclease
 Mungbean yellow mosaic virus

References

External links

Articles containing video clips
Edible legumes
Edible thickening agents
Plants described in 1753
Vigna
Food paste
Crops originating from Asia